Aneta Zając (born 19 April 1982, Warsaw) is a Polish actress.

In 2006, she graduated from The Leon Schiller National Higher School of Film, Television and Theatre in Łódź (Państwowa Wyższa Szkoła Filmowa, Telewizyjna i Teatralna im. Leona Schillera w Łodzi).

Since 2004 she has been playing main role in the Polish TV series Pierwsza miłość.

In 2008 she took part in 3rd season of Polsat show Jak oni śpiewają, which is the Polish version of Soapstar Superstar, finishing in 5th place.

In 2014 she was one of the contestants of Taniec z gwiazdami, the 14th season of the Polish edition of Dancing with the Stars. She won and got "Kryształowa Kula" and 100 000 zlotys.

Filmography

List of television works
 2000–2001:  – Jolanta Wolniak
 2002–2004:  – Aneta Kurowska
 2003:  – daughter of Półpielec
 2003–2005:  – hospital receptionist
 2004:  – Danuta Stachyra
 2004–present:  –  Marysia Radosz
 2005:  – Magdalena Barcz
 2007:  – participant of TV show
 2009:  – Ela
 2012:  – Mariola
 2012: Hotel 52 – Malwina
 2015: Skazane – psycholog
 2019–present:  –  Dominika Porcz, Marysia's twin sister

List of film works 
 2013:  –  Marysia Radosz

References

External links 

 Aneta Zając at filmpolski.pl
 Aneta Zając at filmweb.pl
 

1982 births
Living people
Łódź Film School alumni
Polish film actresses
Polish stage actresses
Actresses from Warsaw
21st-century Polish actresses